Lepismachilis is a genus of jumping bristletails in the family Machilidae. There are more than 20 described species in Lepismachilis.

Species
These 22 species belong to the genus Lepismachilis:

 Lepismachilis affinis Gaju, Bach & Molero, 1993
 Lepismachilis campusminus Bach, 1982
 Lepismachilis cana Wygodzinsky, 1941
 Lepismachilis cisalpina Wygodzinsky, 1941
 Lepismachilis gimnesiana Mendes, 1981
 Lepismachilis handschini Wygodzinsky, 1950
 Lepismachilis hanseni Wygodzinsky, 1941
 Lepismachilis hauseri Bitsch, 1974
 Lepismachilis hoferi Bitsch, 1974
 Lepismachilis insulana Janetschek, 1955
 Lepismachilis istriensis Janetschek, 1959
 Lepismachilis janetscheki Stach, 1958
 Lepismachilis kahmanni Bitsch, 1964
 Lepismachilis notata Stach, 1919
 Lepismachilis osellai Bach, 1982
 Lepismachilis philippi Wygodzinsky, 1953
 Lepismachilis rozsypali Kratochvil, 1945
 Lepismachilis sturmi Janetschek, 1955
 Lepismachilis targionii (Grassi, 1887)
 Lepismachilis transalpina Wygodzinsky, 1941
 Lepismachilis veronensis Bach, 1982
 Lepismachilis y-signata Kratochvil, 1945

References

Further reading

 
 
 
 
 

Archaeognatha
Articles created by Qbugbot